Avellinia is a genus of Mediterranean plants in the grass family. The only known species is Avellinia festucoides, found throughout much of the Mediterranean Region from Portugal and Morocco to Turkey.  It is also reportedly naturalized in Australia.

The type species is Avellinia michelii (Savi) Parl.

References 

Pooideae
Monotypic Poaceae genera